Gerda Antti  (born 1929 in Övertorneå, Norrbotten County) is a Swedish writer and politician. She is a member of the Centre Party and has been a local lay assessor. 

She was married to author Walter Ljungquist.

References 

1929 births
Living people
People from Övertorneå Municipality
Writers from Norrbotten
Swedish women writers
Centre Party (Sweden) politicians
Swedish people of Finnish descent
Litteris et Artibus recipients
21st-century Swedish women politicians
Swedish jurists
Moa Award recipients